Ary ("Arie") Carel Hugo Vosbergen (June 10, 1882 in Rotterdam – November 14, 1918 in Rotterdam) was a Dutch middle distance and long distance runner. He competed in the 1908 Summer Olympics in London.

Vosbergen finished third and last in his initial semifinal heat of the 1500 metres with a time of 4:38.6, not advancing to the final.

In the 800 metres, Vosbergen did not finish his initial semifinal heat and did not advance to the final. He was also a member of the Dutch 3-mile team race team, which lost its heat, and he competed in the 5 mile race and the Marathon, both of which he failed to finish.

In 1914 Vosbergen became Dutch champion in the 10,000 metres. He died of the Spanish flu.

References

Sources
 
 
 Heere, A. and Kappenburg, B. (2000) 1870 – 2000, 130 jaar atletiek in Nederland. Groenevelt b.v.
 

1882 births
1918 deaths
Dutch male middle-distance runners
Dutch male long-distance runners
Athletes (track and field) at the 1908 Summer Olympics
Olympic athletes of the Netherlands
Athletes from Rotterdam
Deaths from Spanish flu
20th-century Dutch people